M. D. Pallavi, also known by her married name Pallavi Arun, is a singer from Karnataka, India. She is a Kannada Sugama Sangeetha Singer, (Playback singer), and Television actor. She is married to Arun, a Percussionist (drums).She is a recipient of the 2018 Ustad Bismillah Khan Yuwa Puraskar awarded by Sangeet Nataka Akademi. She won the Karnataka State Film Awards for Best Playback Singer in 2006 and 2007 for her song  "Nodayya Kwate Lingave" sung in the 2007 film Duniya.

Personal life 
Pallavi comes from a family of artists. Her great grandfather, A.N. Subbarao,  was a painter and started the Kalamandir School of Fine Arts in Bangalore,first fine arts school in India. her grandfather was A S Murthy he was known as Radio Eranna

Music 
M. D. Pallavi started training in Hindustani classical music, and has a degree in Hindustani Music from University of Benares. She received her training in Sugama Sengeetha from Mysore Ananthaswamy. Pallavi has received Hindustani Vocal training in Bangalore under Ram Rao Naik and Rajbhau Sontakke, a doyen of the Gwalior Gharana.

Acting

Television and film
Pallavi made her debut in television with the  television show Mayamruga.  She has also acted in the popular Kannada television show Garva. She won the Aryabhatta "Best Actress" award. She was also a member of cast in the Indian English language film Stumble, released in 2003. This film  won the National Award in the Best English Film category for the year 2002. She also acted with Umashree in National Award winning Kannada movie Gulabi Talkies.

Playback songs 
This is a partial list of notable films where M. D. Pallavi has sung
 ''All films are in Kannada, unless otherwise noted

References

External links

≠

Year of birth missing (living people)
Living people
21st-century Indian actresses
Indian women playback singers
Kannada playback singers
Singers from Karnataka
Women artists from Karnataka
21st-century Indian singers
21st-century Indian women singers